Lâm Đồng is a province located in the Central Highlands region of Vietnam.  Its capital is Đà Lạt. Lâm Đồng borders Khánh Hòa and Ninh Thuận to the east, Đồng Nai province to the southwest, Bình Thuận to the southeast, Đắk Lắk to the north, and Đắk Nông to the northwest. It is the only Central Highlands province which does not share its western border with neither Laos nor Cambodia.

Administrative divisions
Lâm Đồng is subdivided into 12 district-level sub-divisions:

They are further subdivided into 12 commune-level towns (or townlets), 118 communes, and 18 wards.

Economy
The economy is based largely on agriculture, with tea, coffee and vegetables being the main agricultural products. Lâm Đồng province is also famous for its main city -  Đà Lạt (Lâm Đồng attracted 3 million tourists in 2011).
 
The GDP of Lâm Đồng was nearly US$3 billion in 2020.

In the Provincial Competitiveness Index 2020, Lâm Đồng is ranked 15 out of 63 provinces in Vietnam.

Attractions
Cát Tiên National Park  
Bidoup Núi Bà National Park
Many waterfalls such as Cam Ly, Prenn and Datanla
Langbiang mountain
Tuyền Lâm Lake
Thung Lũng Tình Yêu (Love Valley)
Pren
Cát Tiên archaeological site
Linh Phước Pagoda

External links
 Official government website

 
Provinces of Vietnam